The Museum of the Cherokee Indian (MCI) is a 501(c)3 nonprofit cultural arts and history museum, educational center, and archive founded in 1948, and located in Cherokee, North Carolina. The museum provides permanent exhibitions, an artifact collection, workshops, educational programs, and a museum store. Since its founding, the museum has been operated by the Cherokee Historical Association, and has been part of the North American Reciprocal Museum Association.

History 
Museum of the Cherokee Indian was founded in 1948 by the Eastern Band of Cherokee, and was originally located in a log cabin building that also housed McLeans Indian Store and the Ocona Lufty Inn. The Eastern Band of Cherokee also established other local attractions, including the Unto These Hills outdoor theater series in 1950; and the Oconaluftee Indian Village in 1952. The museum's operations have successfully provided tourism, jobs, and commercial enterprise in an area where unemployment was high; while simultaneously highlighting Cherokee people and preserving their cultural traditions as a fundamental part of the museums operation.

The Cherokee Potters Guild was formed in January 2003, after a series of workshops held at the Museum of the Cherokee. The museum also hosts a number of annual summer and fall festivals, including the "Cherokee Voices Festival", and the "Festival of Native Peoples".

Past museum exhibitions have focused on Cherokee history and pre-history with topics such as "stone tools and weapons", "mineral displays", "Indian corn", "Cherokee pipes", "bone ornaments", "seashell ornaments", "game stones", "Oconaluftee Village crafts", "model of ancient burial", "mortar and pestle", "bannerstones, birdstones, and boatstones", "Cherokee people today", "Emissaries of Peace: The 1762 Cherokee/British Delegations" (2004), and the "origins of the American Indian". They work to counteract inaccurate imagery of Cherokee culture often found in mainstream media. 

Folklorist Barbara R. Duncan had been employed by the museum to research Cherokee legends, myths, and family stories. Some were published in "Living Stories of the Cherokee" (University of North Carolina Press, 1998).

Artists and people exhibited 
 Attakullakulla
 Mary Adair
 Goingback Chiltoskey
 Shan Goshorn
 Jenean Hornbuckle
 Will West Long

See also 
 Cherokee Preservation Foundation
 List of museums in North Carolina

References

Further reading

External links 
 

501(c)(19) nonprofit organizations
Eastern Band of Cherokee Indians
Cherokee culture
Museums in Swain County, North Carolina
Native American museums in North Carolina
1948 establishments in North Carolina